Sriram Balaji and Vishnu Vardhan were the defending champions but only Balaji chose to defend his title, partnering Jeevan Nedunchezhiyan. Balaji lost in the final to Hsieh Cheng-peng and Christopher Rungkat.

Hsieh and Rungkat won the title after defeating Balaji and Nedunchezhiyan 6–4, 6–2 in the final.

Seeds

Draw

References
 Main Draw

Shenzhen Longhua Open - Men's Doubles